Keith "Skip" Eaman (born August 14, 1947) is a former Canadian football wide receiver who played four seasons in the Canadian Football League with the Ottawa Rough Riders and Montreal Alouettes. He played CIS football at Queen's University.

College career
Eaman played CIS football for the Queen's Golden Gaels. He was a first team conference All-Star in 1969 and 1970 as a running back. the Gaels won the 4th Vanier Cup on November 22, 1968 against the Wilfrid Laurier Golden Hawks.

Professional career

Ottawa Rough Riders
Eaman was a member of the Ottawa Rough Riders from 1971 to 1973 but saw no playing time in 1973.

Montreal Alouettes
Eaman played for the Montreal Alouettes from 1974 to 1975, winning the 62nd Grey Cup in 1974.

References

External links
Just Sports Stats

Living people
1947 births
Players of Canadian football from Quebec
Canadian football wide receivers
Canadian football running backs
Queen's Golden Gaels football players
Ottawa Rough Riders players
Montreal Alouettes players
Canadian football people from Montreal
Anglophone Quebec people